Juan Manuel Barrientos (born 4 March 1982 in Lomas de Zamora, Buenos Aires) is an Argentine football midfielder.

Career
Barrientos began his career at Racing Club in the Primera Division Argentina in 2003. In 2004, he played 6 months in the Regionalised Torneo Argentino B of Argentine football for Textil Mandiyú. In 2005, he was released by Racing Club and he moved to France.

In 2005, he began his new life in French Ligue 2 club FC Lorient with high expectations. At the end of the 2005-2006 season the club were promoted to Ligue 1 and Barrientos saw his return to top level football.

After his time in the Greek championship, Juan Manuel got married on the 20th of June 2008.

External links

1982 births
Living people
Argentine footballers
Argentine expatriate footballers
Association football defenders
Racing Club de Avellaneda footballers
Deportivo Mandiyú footballers
FC Lorient players
Thrasyvoulos F.C. players
C.D. Olmedo footballers
Trikala F.C. players
PFC Lokomotiv Plovdiv players
Argentine Primera División players
Ligue 1 players
Ligue 2 players
Super League Greece players
First Professional Football League (Bulgaria) players
Expatriate footballers in France
Expatriate footballers in Greece
Expatriate footballers in Ecuador
Expatriate footballers in Bulgaria
Argentine expatriate sportspeople in Greece
Argentine expatriate sportspeople in France
People from Lomas de Zamora
Association football midfielders
Sportspeople from Buenos Aires Province